ASDL may refer to:

 Abstract-Type and Scheme-Definition Language, a computer language 
 Analytical Sciences Digital Library, one of several digital libraries in the US National Science Digital Library

See also
 Asymmetric digital subscriber line (ADSL, a common misspelling)